Rozanski or Różański (feminine: Różańska; plural: Różańscy) is a Polish surname. Notable people with the surname include:

 Agata Różańska (born 1968), Polish astronomer and astrophysicist
 Chuck Rozanski (born 1955), German-American businessman
 Grażyna Różańska (born 1961), Polish rower
 Horacio D. Rozanski (born c. 1969), Argentine-born American businessman
 Józef Różański (1907–1981), Polish intelligence officer
 Mitchell T. Rozanski (born 1958), American Roman Catholic bishop
 Mordechai Rozanski (born 1946), Canadian academic administrator
 Olivia Różański (born 1997), Polish volleyball player
 Renata Mauer-Różańska (born 1969), Polish sport shooter
 Robert Rozanski (born 1961), Polish-born Norwegian sprint canoer
 Włodzimierz Różański (1938–2006), Polish field hockey player

See also
 
 

Polish-language surnames